Lifuka is an island in the Kingdom of Tonga. It is located within the Haapai Group in the centre of the country, to northeast of the national capital of Nukualofa.

It is the administrative centre of the Haapai group of islands with Pangai being the administrative capital village.

History 
Lifuka is the place where Captain James Cook dubbed Tonga "The Friendly Islands". Tofua is where the mutiny on the Bounty occurred in 1789; this active volcanic island lies approximately 40 nautical miles west of Lifuka. The Captain Bligh voyage stands as the longest known successful passage ever recorded in an open boat without modern navigational aids. It was successfully recreated in 2009 by the Talisker Bounty team.

Lifuka Island was the final anchorage of the ill-fated Port au Prince. In 1806 the natives off the northwest coast attacked the British privateer and whaler, slaughtering the majority of the crew. One of the few survivors of the attack, William Mariner, was befriended by the King and spent the next four years in the Kingdom before being allowed to return to England. A chance meeting with the author John Martin upon his return resulted in a collaboration that eventually documented the experiences of Mariner in the book An account of the natives of the Tongan Islands, a now highly respected anthropological study of early civilisation in the Kingdom of Tonga. The anchor of the Port au Prince was rediscovered in 2009 by a dive operator based on Lifuka. In August 2012, the wreck of the ship was discovered off the coast of Foa Island, in Tonga.

Demography 
It has a population of 2,968 and an area of 11.42 km2.

Villages 
 Haʻatoʻu
 Holopeka
 Koulo
 Pangai
 Tongoleleka

Transportation 
There is an airport, the Lifuka Island Airport.

See also 
 List of cities in Tonga

References 

Islands of Tonga
Haʻapai